Schooner may refer to:
 Schooner, a type of sailing vessel
 Schooner, a standard Australian beer glass size, set at 425 mL (15 fl oz) in most of the country.
 Schooner (glass)
 Prairie schooner (disambiguation)
 Schooner Lager, a Canadian lager beer
 Schooner Channel, formerly Schooner Passage, a strait on the Central Coast of British Columbia
 Schooner Creek, a stream in Indiana
 False Schooner Passage is a former name of Allison Harbour, British Columbia
 Schooner Hotel, a 17th-century coaching inn in the coastal village of Alnmouth, Northumberland, England